Peter Prevc (born 20 September 1992) is a Slovenian ski jumper. He won the 2016 Ski Jumping World Cup overall title and four Olympic medals, including gold at the 2022 Winter Olympics in the mixed team event. He also won the 2016 Four Hills Tournament and 2016 Ski Flying World Championships, three consecutive Ski Flying World Cup overall titles (2014, 2015, and 2016), silver and bronze medals at the 2013 Ski Jumping World Championships, bronze at the 2014 Ski Flying World Championships, and bronze and silver with the Slovenian national team at the 2011 Ski Jumping and 2018 Ski Flying World Championships, respectively.

In 2015, in Planica, Prevc became one of the few ski jumpers in history to achieve a "perfect jump", with all five judges awarding him the maximum style points of 20. In the following year, Prevc achieved the most individual World Cup competition wins in a single season – 15 – which is also a record.

Prevc was named Slovenian Sportsman of the Year for four consecutive years between 2013 and 2016. In March 2016, he was voted Athlete of the Month by the United States Sports Academy and also ranked third in the Athlete of the Year voting for 2016.

Early life
Prevc was born in Kranj to Božidar and Julijana Prevc; the family has since been living in the village of Dolenja Vas. He has two brothers and two sisters and is the oldest of five children. Both his brothers, Domen and Cene, and one of his sisters, Nika, are also FIS Ski Jumping World Cup jumpers. His father owns a furniture business and is also an international ski jumping referee. When younger, he trained cross-country skiing and also tried ski jumping. His mother is a librarian.

Prevc attended the first half of his elementary school education in Selca, the second half in Železniki, and gymnasium in Kranj. At the age of nine, Prevc started training in ski jumping at the Bregarca K25 hill, located in Dolenja Vas. At the Junior World Ski Championships in February 2009, he finished 6th in the individual and 5th in the team event.

Professional career

2009–10 to 2012–13: World Cup debut and early seasons
Prevc made his World Cup debut in the 2009–10 season, finishing 22nd in Lillehammer, Norway, on 5 December 2009. In January 2010, at the Junior World Championships, Prevc won silver at the individual and bronze at the team event. 

In February 2010, he was a member of the Slovenian team at the 2010 Winter Olympics in Vancouver, where he finished 7th in the individual normal hill and 16th in the individual large hill. Together with Robert Kranjec, Primož Pikl, and Mitja Mežnar, Prevc finished 8th in the team large hill event. He finished the World Cup season in the 35th place in the overall standings.

In the 2010–11 season, Prevc first participated at the FIS Nordic World Ski Championships 2011 in Oslo. Together with Kranjec, Jernej Damjan, and Jurij Tepeš, he won a bronze medal at the team large hill. At the end of the year, the ski jumping team was voted the Slovenian Sports Team of the Year by the Association of Slovene sports journalists.

In March 2011, Prevc made his ski flying debut in Planica. In the sky flying team event, Prevc won his first World Cup podium, third place. In the overall standings, he finished the season in 24th place.

In the 2011–12 season, Prevc recorded four top 10 finishes. In February, Prevc was a member of the team that won the first-ever World Cup team victory for Slovenia at the ski flying team event in Oberstdorf, together with  Kranjec,  Tepeš, and Jure Šinkovec. Prevc jumped 225.5 meters (which would equal the hill record) in the one-series event but fell hard after the landing and injured his shoulder. He needed surgery which meant he had to finish the season early and also missed out the Ski Flying World Championships in Vikersund. Although he missed the last five events of the season, Prevc finished 15th in the overall standings.

In the 2012–13 season, Prevc won three World Cup team events in Zakopane, Willingen, and Planica. At the FIS Nordic World Ski Championships 2013 in Val di Fiemme, Prevc won a silver medal at the individual large hill event and a bronze medal at the individual normal hill event.

At the season's last two events in Planica, Prevc reached his first two individual World Cup podiums, a second and a third place. He finished the season 7th in the overall standings. At the end of the year, Prevc was voted the Slovenian Sportsman of the Year for the first time.

2013–14 and 2014–15: The runner-up
In the 2013–14 season, Prevc recorded his first individual World Cup win in Kulm. Prevc won the season's ski flying title with second place at the same venue since there were only two scheduled ski flying events. He went on to win in Sapporo, which brought him to the top of the World Cup overall standings for the first time in his career, where he remained for the next couple of events. 

At the end of the season, he finished second in the overall rankings after Kamil Stoch of Poland. Prevc also won the last world cup event of the season in Planica, accumulating three wins and eleven podiums in total, which was his most successful season until then.

At the 2014 Winter Olympics in Sochi, Russia, Prevc won a silver medal at the normal hill event and a bronze medal at the large hill event. At the FIS Ski Flying World Championships 2014, he took bronze after the last two out of four jumps were cancelled.

The 2014–15 season was very successful for Prevc, with three wins and eleven more podiums in the World Cup. In addition, he won two team events and one third place with the Slovenian team. On 14 February 2015, Prevc set a new ski flying world record in Vikersund with a 250 m (820 ft) jump; this record was beaten the following day with a  jump by Anders Fannemel. On 20 March in Planica, Prevc achieved a "perfect jump" with all style referees awarding him maximum 20 points. At the same event, he also set a new hill record with 248.5 m. Prevc spent a couple of weeks at the top of the standings during the season. In the end, he had the same number of points as Severin Freund of Germany, but the overall title went to Freund because of the higher number of victories during the season (9 for Freund and 3 for Prevc). Prevc defended the ski flying title.

At the 2015 World Championships, Prevc finished fourth on the large hill, thirteenth on the normal hill, and sixth with the Slovenian team at the team event. Prevc took two third places at the 2014–15 Four Hills Tournament, which secured him a third place in the overall tournament standing.

2015–16: The record-breaking season

In the 2015–16 season, Prevc won 15 out of 29 World Cup events, the Four Hills Tournament, and the overall and ski flying titles.

On 19 December in Engelberg, Peter and his younger brother Domen Prevc both finished on the podium as the first pair of brothers in World Cup history. With three wins and one third place, Prevc won the 2016 Four Hills Tournament, thus becoming the second Slovenian ski jumper to win the Tournament after Primož Peterka in the 1996–97 season.

On 16 January at the Ski Flying World Championships in Kulm, Prevc became the ski flying world champion. The event consisted of three rounds, as the fourth round was cancelled because of strong wind. He set two hill records during the competition.

On 14 February in Vikersund, Prevc won the event despite sliding upon landing (he remained on his feet nevertheless), which rarely happens in ski jumping. By winning the second event in Almaty on 28 February, Prevc secured his first World Cup title, six events before the end of the season. At the end of the season, Prevc broke several statistical records. He won the highest number of points, victories, and podium finishes in a single season (2303 points, 15 victories, and 22 podiums in total, the previous records being 2083 points, 13 victories, and 20 podiums by Gregor Schlierenzauer from the 2008–09 season). Other records include the point difference between the first and the second in the overall standings (813), the best average of points per event (79.4), and the highest number of points in the Four Hills Tournament (1139.4). By winning the ski flying title, Prevc became the first ski jumper to win the title for three years in a row.

2016–17
At the first event of the 2016–17 season in Ruka, Finland, Prevc, who was leading after the first series, fell upon landing in the second series and finished third. His brother Domen scored his first World Cup victory on that occasion. Throughout December, Prevc was struggling with his jumps, fell again upon landing at the first event in Engelberg and did not reach the final round at the second event. After the Four Hill Tournament, where he finished 14th, Prevc skipped the events in Wisla. Following the break, his results started to improve again. Prevc was the best individual in the team event in Zakopane, where the Slovenian team finished third. The team event in Willingen saw, for the first time, all three Prevc brothers representing Slovenia; together with Tepeš, they finished fourth. On 11 February, he won his only event of the season in Sapporo; it was a double win with Maciej Kot. Prevc's best result at the World Championships was a fourth place in the mixed event. He collected five more top 10 World Cup finishes by the end of the season. He finished 9th in the overall and 5th both in the sky flying and in the inaugural Raw Air standings.

Major tournament results

Winter Olympics

FIS Nordic World Ski Championships

FIS Ski Flying World Championships

World Cup results

Standings

Individual wins

Individual starts

Awards and nominations

References

External links

1992 births
Living people
Sportspeople from Kranj
Olympic ski jumpers of Slovenia
Slovenian male ski jumpers
Ski jumpers at the 2010 Winter Olympics
Ski jumpers at the 2014 Winter Olympics
Ski jumpers at the 2018 Winter Olympics
Ski jumpers at the 2022 Winter Olympics
FIS Nordic World Ski Championships medalists in ski jumping
Medalists at the 2014 Winter Olympics
Medalists at the 2022 Winter Olympics
Olympic gold medalists for Slovenia
Olympic silver medalists for Slovenia
Olympic bronze medalists for Slovenia
Olympic medalists in ski jumping
World record setters in ski flying
Prevc family
21st-century Slovenian people